The Kamakhya–Mumbai LTT AC Express is a Superfast fully air-conditioned Express train connecting Guwahati and Mumbai.

This is the first fully air conditioned train connecting the north eastern and western parts of India touching West Bengal, Bihar, Uttar Pradesh, Madhya Pradesh and Maharashtra. It is the fastest train connecting Northeast India and Mumbai

This train was announced in Union Railway Budget 2012 and it made its first inaugural run on 18 April 2013.

Assam Chief Minister Tarun Gogoi flagged off the first fully air-conditioned Kamakhya–Lokmanya Tilak Terminal Mumbai AC Express, at a function held at Kamakhya railway station.

Accommodations
This train comprises 1 First AC, 4 AC 2-Tiers, 11 AC 3-Tiers, 1 AC Hot Buffet Car & 2 Luggage/Parcel cum Generator cum Brake van one of which is provided with the Guards' cabin. Total coach composition is 19. This train will be using the latest LHB coach. Rakes are owned and maintained by Northeast Frontier Railway (NFR).

Major halts

ASSAM
  (Starts)
 
 

WEST BENGAL 
 
 New Jalpaiguri (Siliguri)

BIHAR
 
 
 
 
 
 Barauni
 
 
 

UTTAR PRADESH
 Pandit Deen Dayal Upadhyay Junction
 
 Prayagraj Chheoki

MADHYA PRADESH
 
 
 
 

MAHARASHTRA
 
 
 
 
 
 
 
 Lokmanya Tilak Terminus (Ends)

Traction
A Gomoh-based WAP-7 hauls the train from Lokmanya Tilak Terminus till Kamakhya Junction and vice versa.

References

External links
 Indian Railway Website

Transport in Mumbai
Transport in Guwahati
AC Express (Indian Railways) trains
Rail transport in Assam
Rail transport in Uttar Pradesh
Rail transport in Madhya Pradesh
Rail transport in West Bengal
Rail transport in Bihar
Rail transport in Maharashtra
Railway services introduced in 2013